Malika Kanthong (born January 8, 1987) is a member of the Thailand women's national volleyball team.

Career
Malika won the Best Server individual award of the 2015–16 Azerbaijan Super League season, playing with Azeryol Baku, that lost to Lokomotiv Baku the bronze medal 0-3.
She played in the 2010 and the 2011 Club World Championship placing fifth with the Thai club Federbrau and Chang. She played the 2015–16 Azerbaijan Super League with Azeryol Baku and ended the season in fourth place.

She is on the list 2019 Korea-Thailand all star super match competition.

Clubs
  Tan Hao (2006–2007)
  Federbrau (2008–2009)
  Ereğli Belediye (2009-2010)
  Fujian Xi Meng Bao (2010–2011)
  Chang (2010–2011)
  Igtisadchi Baku (2012–2013)
  Jakarta Pertamina (2013–2015)
  Nonthaburi (2011–2014)
  Azeryol Baku (2015–2017)
  Supreme Chonburi (2017–2018)
  Nakhon Ratchasima (2018–2019)
  Diamond Food (2019–2021)
  Supreme Chonburi (2021–present)

Awards

Individuals
 2009 FIVB World Grand Champions Cup – "Best Server"
 2014-15 Indonesian Proliga – "Best Server"
 2015–16 Azerbaijan Super League – "Best Server"
 2016–17 Azerbaijan Super League – "Best Receiver"
 2017–18 Thailand League – "Best Opposite Spiker"
 2018–19 Thailand League – "Best Opposite Spiker"

Clubs
 2010–11 Chinese League Division 2 –  Champion, with Fujian Xi Meng Bao
 2011–12 Thailand League –  Champion, with Nakornnonthaburi
 2012–13 Azerbaijan Super League –  Runner-up, with Igtisadchi Baku
 2013–14 Indonesia League –  Champion, with Jakarta Pertamina
 2014–15 Indonesia League –  Champion, with Jakarta Pertamina
 2016–17 Azerbaijan Super League –  Runner-up, with Azerrail Baku
 2017–18 Thailand League –  Champion, with Supreme Chonburi
 2018 Thai–Denmark Super League –  Champion, with Supreme Chonburi
 2018–19 Thailand League –  Champion, with Nakhon Ratchasima
 2007 Asian Club Championship –  Runner-up, with Sang Som
 2008 Asian Club Championship –  Runner-up, with Sang Som
 2009 Asian Club Championship –  Champion, with Federbrau
 2010 Asian Club Championship –  Champion, with Federbrau
 2011 Asian Club Championship –  Champion, with Chang
 2012 Asian Club Championship –  Bronze medal, with Chang

Royal decorations
 2013 -  Commander (Third Class) of The Most Exalted Order of the White Elephant
 2010 -  Commander (Third Class) of The Most Admirable Order of the Direkgunabhorn

References

External links
 

1987 births
Living people
Malika Kanthong
Thai expatriate sportspeople in Azerbaijan
Asian Games medalists in volleyball
Volleyball players at the 2006 Asian Games
Volleyball players at the 2010 Asian Games
Volleyball players at the 2014 Asian Games
Volleyball players at the 2018 Asian Games
Malika Kanthong
Malika Kanthong
Malika Kanthong
Medalists at the 2014 Asian Games
Medalists at the 2018 Asian Games
Universiade medalists in volleyball
Malika Kanthong
Southeast Asian Games medalists in volleyball
Competitors at the 2007 Southeast Asian Games
Competitors at the 2009 Southeast Asian Games
Competitors at the 2011 Southeast Asian Games
Competitors at the 2013 Southeast Asian Games
Universiade bronze medalists for Thailand
Competitors at the 2019 Southeast Asian Games
Medalists at the 2013 Summer Universiade
Opposite hitters
Malika Kanthong
Malika Kanthong
Thai expatriate sportspeople in Vietnam
Thai expatriate sportspeople in China
Thai expatriate sportspeople in Turkey
Thai expatriate sportspeople in Indonesia
Expatriate volleyball players in China
Expatriate volleyball players in Indonesia
Expatriate volleyball players in Turkey
Expatriate volleyball players in Azerbaijan
Expatriate volleyball players in Vietnam